"We All Make Mistakes" is the debut single by Australian singer-songwriter Stephen Cummings, released in December 1982 through Regular Records. The song was written by Cummings and Ian Stephen. It was released as the first single from Cummings' debut studio album Senso. The song peaked at number 89 on the Kent Music Report.

Track listing

Personnel 
 Arranged by (brass arrangements) – Greg Flood
 Joe Creighton - Bass, Additional vocals
 Mark Ferry - Bass
 Vince Jones - Cornet (solo)
 Martin Armiger - Drum programming (Drumulator), Guitar, Keyboards
 Peter Luscombe - Drums
 Andrew Pendlebury - Guitar
 Robert Goodge - Guitar
 Duncan Veal - Keyboards
 Jantra de Vilda - Keyboards
 Stephen Bigger - Keyboards
 Ricky Fataar -  Percussion
 Venetta Fields - Additional vocals
 Nick Smith - Additional vocals
 Linda Nutter - Additional vocals
 Nick Smith - Additional vocals
 Stephanie Sproul - Additional vocals

Charts

References 

1982 debut singles
1982 songs
Stephen Cummings songs
Songs written by Stephen Cummings
Song recordings produced by Martin Armiger
Warner Music Group singles
Regular Records singles